Miss World Philippines 2018 was the 8th edition of the Miss World Philippines pageant. It was held at the Mall of Asia Arena in Pasay, Philippines on October 7, 2018. 

At the end of the event, Laura Lehmann crowned Katarina Rodriguez as Miss World Philippines 2018, Teresita Marquez crowned Alyssa Alvarez as Reina Hispanoamericana Filipinas 2018, Cynthia Thomalla crowned Maureen Montagne as Miss Eco Philippines 2018, and Sophia Señoron crowned Kimilei Mugford as Miss Multinational Philippines 2018. Chanel Morales was named First Princess, while Pearl Hung was named Second Princess.

The event was attended by Miss World 2016 Stephanie Del Valle of Puerto Rico, Miss World 2017 Manushi Chhillar of India, and the chairman of the Miss World organization Julia Morley.

Results 
Color keys
  The contestant was a Runner-up in an International pageant.
  The contestant was a Semi-Finalist in an International pageant.
  The contestant did not place.

Special Awards

Events

Fast Track Events

Judges 
 Kiko Estrada - Actor
 Louie Heredia - Composer and hitmaker
 Dr. Noel Fajardo - Gastroenterologist
 Mark Striegl - Mixed martial artist fighter
 Tati Fortuna - Fashion designer
 David Semerad - PBA basketball player
 Dr. Filippo Cremonini - Gastroenterologist
 Ariella Arida - Miss Universe 2013 3rd Runner-up
 Cathy Valencia - CEO, Cathy Valencia Advanced Skin Clinic
 Stephen Reilly - CEO, Resorts World Manila
 Arch. Miguel Pastor - Architect
 Stephanie Del Valle - Miss World 2016 from Puerto Rico
 Ivo Buchta - Austrian international model
 Tony Chua - President & CEO, iFace Inc.
 Manushi Chhillar - Miss World 2017 from India
 Nenita Lim - VP of Finance, Suyen Corporation
 Jeffrey Lin - CEO, GCOX
 Megan Young - Miss World Philippines 2013 and Miss World 2013
 Sec. Francis Tolentino - Secretary and Presidential Adviser for Political Affairs
 Gen. Ronald "Bato" Dela Rosa - former PNP chief and Current Director General of Bureau of Corrections
 Vivienne Tan - Executive Vice President, Commercial Group at Philippine Airlines

Contestants 

40 contestants competed for the four titles.

Withdrawals 
Maria Gail Tobes quit the competition and was replaced by Maisa Llanes as #15.

Notes

Post-pageant Notes 

 Katarina Rodriguez competed at Miss World 2018 in Sanya, China where she failed to place in the semifinals. Alyssa Muhlach Alvarez also failed to placed at the semifinals of the Reina Hispanoamericana 2018 pageant in Bolivia.
 Maureen Montagne on the other hand, finished as First Runner-Up at Miss Eco International 2019 in Egypt. On May 28, 2020, it was announced that Montagne will take over the Miss Eco International 2019 title after the original winner, Suheyn Cipriani of Peru, was dethroned. However, on May 30, 2020, it was announced that the Fourth Runner-Up, Amy Tinie Abdul Aziz of Malaysia, will take over the title, due to Montagne declining the offer as she is already competing at Binibining Pilipinas. She was then crowned at Binibining Pilipinas 2021 as Binibining Pilipinas Globe 2021, and competed at The Miss Globe 2021 pageant in Tirana, Albania where she emerged as the winner.
 Kimilei Mugford competed at Miss Multinational 2018 in New Delhi, India, where she finished as part of the Top 5 finalists. Aside from finishing as a Top 5 finalist, Mugford also won the Sports Challenge event of the competition.

References

External links 
 

2018
2018 beauty pageants
2018 in the Philippines